The 2003–04 season saw Dunfermline Athletic compete in the Scottish Premier League where they finished in 4th position with 53 points. They also reached the 2004 Scottish Cup Final where they lost 3–1 to Celtic.

Final league table

Results
Dunfermline Athletic's score comes first

Legend

Scottish Premier League

Scottish Cup

Scottish League Cup

References

External links
 Dunfermline Athletic 2003–04 at Soccerbase.com (select relevant season from dropdown list)

Dunfermline Athletic F.C. seasons
Dunfermline Athletic